Aah... Alisha! is a 1986 platinum-selling, Hindi-language pop album by Indi-pop star Alisha Chinai.  As well as singing each song, she factored heavily in the production, having co-written seven of the eight songs.

Track listing
Babusha (Banks, Johri, Alisha)	
Kissko Dil De Doon (Johri, Alisha)
Sayani	(Johri)
Aaja (Alisha, Johri)
Gungunane Laga Hai Dil (Johri, Alisha, Ila Arun)	
Taara (Banks, Alisha)
Jannat	(Johri, Alisha)
Aah...Alisha! (Johri, Arun)

References

External links
 https://www.discogs.com/Alisha-AahAlisha/release/7932837

1986 albums
Alisha Chinai albums
Hindi-language albums